Natural gas (also called fossil gas or simply gas) is a naturally occurring mixture of gaseous hydrocarbons consisting primarily of methane in addition to various smaller amounts of other higher alkanes. Low levels of trace gases like carbon dioxide, nitrogen, hydrogen sulfide, and helium are also usually present. Natural gas is colorless and odorless, so odorizers such as mercaptan (which smells like sulfur or rotten eggs) are commonly added to natural gas supplies for safety so that leaks can be readily detected.

Natural gas is a fossil fuel and non-renewable resource that is formed when layers of organic matter (primarily marine microorganisms) decompose under anaerobic conditions and are subjected to intense heat and pressure underground over millions of years. The energy that the decayed organisms originally obtained from the sun via photosynthesis is stored as chemical energy within the molecules of methane and other hydrocarbons. 

Natural gas can be burned for heating, cooking, and electricity generation. It is also used as a chemical feedstock in the manufacture of plastics and other commercially important organic chemicals and less commonly used as a fuel for vehicles. 

The extraction and consumption of natural gas is a major and growing contributor to climate change.  Both the gas itself (specifically methane) and carbon dioxide, which is released when natural gas is burned, are greenhouse gases. When burned for heat or electricity, natural gas emits fewer toxic air pollutants, less carbon dioxide, and almost no particulate matter compared to other fossil and biomass fuels. However, gas venting and unintended fugitive emissions throughout the supply chain can result in natural gas having a similar carbon footprint to other fossil fuels overall. 

Natural gas can be found in underground geological formations, often alongside other fossil fuels like coal and oil (petroleum). Most natural gas has been created through either biogenic or thermogenic processes. Biogenic gas is formed when methanogenic organisms in marshes, bogs, landfills, and shallow sediments anaerobically decompose but are not subjected to high temperatures and pressures. Thermogenic gas takes a much longer period of time to form and is created when organic matter is heated and compressed deep underground.

During petroleum production, natural gas is sometimes flared rather than being collected and used. Before natural gas can be burned as a fuel or used in manufacturing processes, it almost always has to be processed to remove impurities such as water. The byproducts of this processing include ethane, propane, butanes, pentanes, and higher molecular weight hydrocarbons. Hydrogen sulfide (which may be converted into pure sulfur), carbon dioxide, water vapor, and sometimes helium and nitrogen must also be removed. 

Natural gas is sometimes informally referred to simply as "gas", especially when it is being compared to other energy sources, such as oil or coal. However, it is not to be confused with gasoline, which is often shortened in colloquial usage to "gas", especially in North America.

Natural gas is measured in standard cubic meters or standard cubic feet. The density compared to air ranges from 0.58 (16.8 g/mole, 0.71 kg per standard cubic meter) to as high as 0.79 (22.9 g/mole, 0.97 kg per scm), but generally less than 0.64 (18.5 g/mole, 0.78 kg per scm). For comparison, pure methane (16.0425 g/mole) has a density 0.5539 times that of air (0.678 kg per standard cubic meter).

History
Natural gas can come out of the ground and cause a long-burning fire. In ancient Greece, the gas flames at Mount Chimaera contributed to the legend of the fire-breathing creature Chimera. In ancient China, gas resulting from the drilling for brines was first used by about 400 BC. The Chinese transported gas seeping from the ground in crude pipelines of bamboo to where it was used to boil salt water to extract the salt in the Ziliujing District of Sichuan.

The discovery and identification of natural gas in the Americas happened in 1626. 

The first commercialized natural gas occurred in Britain around 1785, where natural gas produced from coal was used to light houses and streets.

In 1821, William Hart successfully dug the first natural gas well at Fredonia, New York, United States, which led in 1858 to the formation of the Fredonia Gas Light Company. The city of Philadelphia created the first municipally owned natural gas distribution venture in 1836. By 2009, 66,000 km3 (16,000 mi3) (or 8%) had been used out of the total 850,000 km3 (200,000 mi3) of estimated remaining recoverable reserves of natural gas.

Sources

Natural gas

In the 19th century, natural gas was primarily obtained as a by-product of producing oil.  The small, light gas carbon chains came out of solution as the extracted fluids underwent pressure reduction from the reservoir to the surface, similar to uncapping a soft drink bottle where the carbon dioxide effervesces. The gas was often viewed as a by-product, a hazard, and a disposal problem in active oil fields.  The large volumes produced could not be used until relatively expensive pipeline and storage facilities were constructed to deliver the gas to consumer markets.

Until the early part of the 20th century, most natural gas associated with oil was either simply released or burned off at oil fields. Gas venting and production flaring are still practised in modern times, but efforts are ongoing around the world to retire them, and to replace them with other commercially viable and useful alternatives. Unwanted gas (or stranded gas without a market) is often returned to the reservoir with 'injection' wells while awaiting a possible future market or to re-pressurize the formation, which can enhance oil extraction rates from other wells. In regions with a high natural gas demand (such as the US), pipelines are constructed when it is economically feasible to transport gas from a wellsite to an end consumer.

In addition to transporting gas via pipelines for use in power generation, other end uses for natural gas include export as liquefied natural gas (LNG) or conversion of natural gas into other liquid products via gas to liquids (GTL) technologies. GTL technologies can convert natural gas into liquids products such as gasoline, diesel or jet fuel. A variety of GTL technologies have been developed, including Fischer–Tropsch (F–T), methanol to gasoline (MTG) and syngas to gasoline plus (STG+). F–T produces a synthetic crude that can be further refined into finished products, while MTG can produce synthetic gasoline from natural gas. STG+ can produce drop-in gasoline, diesel, jet fuel and aromatic chemicals directly from natural gas via a single-loop process.

Natural gas can be "associated" (found in oil fields), or "non-associated" (isolated in natural gas fields), and is also found in coal beds (as coalbed methane). It sometimes contains a significant amount of ethane, propane, butane, and pentane—heavier hydrocarbons removed for commercial use prior to the methane being sold as a consumer fuel or chemical plant feedstock. Non-hydrocarbons such as carbon dioxide, nitrogen, helium (rarely), and hydrogen sulfide must also be removed before the natural gas can be transported.

Natural gas extracted from oil wells is called casinghead gas (whether or not truly produced up the annulus and through a casinghead outlet) or associated gas. The natural gas industry is extracting an increasing quantity of gas from challenging, unconventional resource types: sour gas, tight gas, shale gas, and coalbed methane.

There is some disagreement on which country has the largest proven gas reserves. Sources that consider that Russia has by far the largest proven reserves include the US Central Intelligence Agency (47,600 km3) and Energy Information Administration (47,800 km3), as well as the Organization of Petroleum Exporting Countries (48,700 km3). Contrarily, BP credits Russia with only 32,900 km3, which would place it in second, slightly behind Iran (33,100 to 33,800 km3, depending on the source). 

It is estimated that there are about 900,000 km3 of "unconventional" gas such as shale gas, of which 180,000 km3 may be recoverable. In turn, many studies from MIT, Black & Veatch and the US Department of Energy predict that natural gas will account for a larger portion of electricity generation and heat in the future.

The world's largest gas field is the offshore South Pars / North Dome Gas-Condensate field, shared between Iran and Qatar.

Because natural gas is not a pure product, as the reservoir pressure drops when non-associated gas is extracted from a field under supercritical (pressure/temperature) conditions, the higher molecular weight components may partially condense upon isothermic depressurizing—an effect called retrograde condensation. The liquid thus formed may get trapped as the pores of the gas reservoir get depleted. One method to deal with this problem is to re-inject dried gas free of condensate to maintain the underground pressure and to allow re-evaporation and extraction of condensates. More frequently, the liquid condenses at the surface, and one of the tasks of the gas plant is to collect this condensate. The resulting liquid is called natural gas liquid (NGL) and has commercial value.

Shale gas

Shale gas is natural gas produced from shale. Because shale has matrix permeability too low to allow gas to flow in economical quantities, shale gas wells depend on fractures to allow the gas to flow. Early shale gas wells depended on natural fractures through which gas flowed; almost all shale gas wells today require fractures artificially created by hydraulic fracturing. Since 2000, shale gas has become a major source of natural gas in the United States and Canada. Because of increased shale gas production the United States was in 2014 the number one natural gas producer in the world. The production of shale gas in the United States has been described as a "shale gas revolution" and as "one of the landmark events in the 21st century."

Following the increased production in the United States, shale gas exploration is beginning in countries such as Poland, China, and South Africa. Chinese geologists have identified the Sichuan Basin as a promising target for shale gas drilling, because of the similarity of shales to those that have proven productive in the United States. Production from the Wei-201 well is between 10,000 and 20,000 m3 per day. In late 2020, China National Petroleum Corporation claimed daily production of 20 million cubic meters of gas from its Changning-Weiyuan demonstration zone.

Town gas

Town gas is a flammable gaseous fuel made by the destructive distillation of coal. It contains a variety of calorific gases including hydrogen, carbon monoxide, methane, and other volatile hydrocarbons, together with small quantities of non-calorific gases such as carbon dioxide and nitrogen, and was used in a similar way to natural gas. This is a historical technology and is not usually economically competitive with other sources of fuel gas today.

Most town "gashouses" located in the eastern US in the late 19th and early 20th centuries were simple by-product coke ovens that heated bituminous coal in air-tight chambers. The gas driven off from the coal was collected and distributed through networks of pipes to residences and other buildings where it was used for cooking and lighting. (Gas heating did not come into widespread use until the last half of the 20th century.) The coal tar (or asphalt) that collected in the bottoms of the gashouse ovens was often used for roofing and other waterproofing purposes, and when mixed with sand and gravel was used for paving streets.

Crystallized natural gas – clathrates
Huge quantities of natural gas (primarily methane) exist in the form of clathrates under sediment on offshore continental shelves and on land in arctic regions that experience permafrost, such as those in Siberia. Hydrates require a combination of high pressure and low temperature to form.

In 2013, Japan Oil, Gas and Metals National Corporation (JOGMEC) announced that they had recovered commercially relevant quantities of natural gas from methane hydrate.

Processing

The image below is a schematic block flow diagram of a typical natural gas processing plant. It shows the various unit processes used to convert raw natural gas into sales gas pipelined to the end user markets.

The block flow diagram also shows how processing of the raw natural gas yields byproduct sulfur, byproduct ethane, and natural gas liquids (NGL) propane, butanes and natural gasoline (denoted as pentanes +).

Demand

As of mid-2020, natural gas production in the US had peaked three times, with current levels exceeding both previous peaks. It reached 24.1 trillion cubic feet per year in 1973, followed by a decline, and reached 24.5 trillion cubic feet in 2001. After a brief drop, withdrawals increased nearly every year since 2006 (owing to the shale gas boom), with 2017 production at 33.4 trillion cubic feet and 2019 production at 40.7 trillion cubic feet. After the third peak in December 2019, extraction continued to fall from March onward due to decreased demand caused by the COVID-19 pandemic in the US. 

The 2021 global energy crisis was driven by a global surge in demand as the world quit the economic recession caused by COVID-19, particularly due to strong energy demand in Asia.

Storage and transport

Because of its low density, it is not easy to store natural gas or to transport it by vehicle. Natural gas pipelines are impractical across oceans, since the gas needs to be cooled down and compressed, as the friction in the pipeline causes the gas to heat up. Many existing pipelines in the US are close to reaching their capacity, prompting some politicians representing northern states to speak of potential shortages. The large trade cost implies that natural gas markets are globally much less integrated, causing significant price differences across countries. In Western Europe, the gas pipeline network is already dense. New pipelines are planned or under construction in Eastern Europe and between gas fields in Russia, Near East and Northern Africa and Western Europe.

Whenever gas is bought or sold at custody transfer points, rules and agreements are made regarding the gas quality. Usually sales quality gas that has been treated to remove contamination is traded on a "dry gas" basis and is required to be commercially free from objectionable odours, materials, and dust or other solid or liquid matter, waxes, gums and gum forming constituents, which might damage or adversely affect operation of equipment downstream of the custody transfer point.

LNG carriers transport liquefied natural gas (LNG) across oceans, while tank trucks can carry liquefied or compressed natural gas (CNG) over shorter distances. Sea transport using CNG carrier ships that are now under development may be competitive with LNG transport in specific conditions.

Gas is turned into liquid at a liquefaction plant, and is returned to gas form at regasification plant at the terminal. Shipborne regasification equipment is also used.

CNG is transported at high pressure, typically above . Compressors and decompression equipment are less capital intensive and may be economical in smaller unit sizes than liquefaction/regasification plants. Natural gas trucks and carriers may transport natural gas directly to end-users, or to distribution points such as pipelines.

In the past, the natural gas which was recovered in the course of recovering petroleum could not be profitably sold, and was simply burned at the oil field in a process known as flaring. Flaring is now illegal in many countries. Additionally, higher demand in the last 20–30 years has made production of gas associated with oil economically viable. As a further option, the gas is now sometimes re-injected into the formation for enhanced oil recovery by pressure maintenance as well as miscible or immiscible flooding. Conservation, re-injection, or flaring of natural gas associated with oil is primarily dependent on proximity to markets (pipelines), and regulatory restrictions.

Natural gas can be indirectly exported through the absorption in other physical output. A recent study suggests that the expansion of shale gas production in the US has caused prices to drop relative to other countries. This has caused a boom in energy intensive manufacturing sector exports, whereby the average dollar unit of US manufacturing exports has almost tripled its energy content between 1996 and 2012.

A "master gas system" was invented in Saudi Arabia in the late 1970s, ending any necessity for flaring. Satellite and nearby infra-red camera observations, however, shows that flaring and venting are still happening in some countries.

Natural gas is used to generate electricity and heat for desalination. Similarly, some landfills that also discharge methane gases have been set up to capture the methane and generate electricity.

Natural gas is often stored underground [references about geological storage needed]inside depleted gas reservoirs from previous gas wells, salt domes, or in tanks as liquefied natural gas.  The gas is injected in a time of low demand and extracted when demand picks up. Storage nearby end users helps to meet volatile demands, but such storage may not always be practicable.

With 15 countries accounting for 84% of the worldwide extraction, access to natural gas has become an important issue in international politics, and countries vie for control of pipelines. In the first decade of the 21st century, Gazprom, the state-owned energy company in Russia, engaged in disputes with Ukraine and Belarus over the price of natural gas, which have created concerns that gas deliveries to parts of Europe could be cut off for political reasons. The United States is preparing to export natural gas.

Floating liquefied natural gas
Floating liquefied natural gas (FLNG) is an innovative technology designed to enable the development of offshore gas resources that would otherwise remain untapped due to environmental or economic factors which currently make them impractical to develop via a land-based LNG operation. FLNG technology also provides a number of environmental and economic advantages:
 Environmental – Because all processing is done at the gas field, there is no requirement for long pipelines to shore, compression units to pump the gas to shore, dredging and jetty construction, and onshore construction of an LNG processing plant, which significantly reduces the environmental footprint. Avoiding construction also helps preserve marine and coastal environments. In addition, environmental disturbance will be minimised during decommissioning because the facility can easily be disconnected and removed before being refurbished and re-deployed elsewhere.
 Economic – Where pumping gas to shore can be prohibitively expensive, FLNG makes development economically viable. As a result, it will open up new business opportunities for countries to develop offshore gas fields that would otherwise remain stranded, such as those offshore East Africa.

Many gas and oil companies are considering the economic and environmental benefits of floating liquefied natural gas (FLNG). There are currently projects underway to construct five FLNG facilities. Petronas is close to completion on their FLNG-1 at Daewoo Shipbuilding and Marine Engineering and are underway on their FLNG-2 project at Samsung Heavy Industries. Shell Prelude is due to start production 2017. The Browse LNG project will commence FEED in 2019.

Uses

Natural gas is primarily used in the northern hemisphere. North America and Europe are major consumers.

Often well head gases require removal of various hydrocarbon molecules contained within the gas. Some of these gases include heptane, pentane, propane and other hydrocarbons with molecular weights above methane. The processed natural gas may then be used for residential, commercial and industrial uses.

Mid-stream natural gas
Natural gas flowing in the distribution lines is called mid-stream natural gas and is often used to power engines which rotate compressors. These compressors are required in the transmission line to pressurize and repressurize the mid-stream natural gas as the gas travels. Typically, natural gas powered engines require  natural gas to operate at the rotational name plate specifications. Several methods are used to remove these higher molecular weighted gases for use by the natural gas engine. A few technologies are as follows:
 Joule–Thomson skid
 Cryogenic or chiller system
 Chemical enzymology system

Power generation

Domestic use

Natural gas dispensed in a residential setting can generate temperatures in excess of  making it a powerful domestic cooking and heating fuel. In much of the developed world it is supplied through pipes to homes, where it is used for many purposes including ranges and ovens, heating/cooling, and central heating. Heaters in homes and other buildings may include boilers, furnaces, and water heaters. Both North America and Europe are major consumers of natural gas.

Systems using EP have a regulator at the service entrance to step down the pressure to UP. 

The maximum allowable operating pressure for natural gas piping systems within a building is based on NFPA 54: National Fuel Gas Code, except when approved by the Public Safety Authority or when insurance companies have more stringent requirements.{{ 

Generally, natural gas system pressures are not allowed to exceed 5 psig (34.5 kPa) unless all of the following conditions are met:
 The AHJ will allow a higher pressure.
 The distribution pipe is welded. (Note: 2. Some jurisdictions may also require that welded joints be radiographed to verify continuity).
 The pipes are closed for protection and placed in a ventilated area that does not allow gas accumulation.
 The pipe is installed in the areas used for industrial processes, research, storage or mechanical equipment rooms.

Generally, a maximum liquefied petroleum gas pressure of 20 psig (138 kPa) is allowed, provided the building is used specifically for industrial or research purposes and is constructed in accordance with NFPA 58: Liquefied Petroleum Gas Code, Chapter 7.

A seismic earthquake valve operating at a pressure of 55 psig (3.7 bar) can stop the flow of natural gas into the site wide natural gas distribution piping network (that runs (outdoors underground, above building roofs, and or within the upper supports of a canopy roof). Seismic earthquake valves are designed for use at a maximum of 60 psig.

In Australia, natural gas is transported from gas processing facilities to regulator stations via Transmission pipelines. Gas is then regulated down to distributed pressures and the gas is distributed around a gas network via gas mains. Small branches from the network, called services, connect individual domestic dwellings, or multi-dwelling buildings to the network. The networks typically range in pressures from 7 kPa (low pressure) to 515 kPa (high pressure). Gas is then regulated down to 1.1 kPa or 2.75 kPa, before being metered and passed to the consumer for domestic use. Natural gas mains are made from a variety of materials: historically cast iron, though more modern mains are made from steel or polyethylene.

In the US compressed natural gas (CNG) is available in some rural areas as an alternative to less expensive and more abundant LPG (liquefied petroleum gas), the dominant source of rural gas.  It is used in homes lacking direct connections to public utility provided gas, or to fuel portable grills.  Natural gas is also supplied by independent natural gas suppliers through Natural Gas Choice programs throughout the United States.

Transportation
CNG is a cleaner and also cheaper alternative to other automobile fuels such as gasoline (petrol). By the end of 2014, there were over 20 million natural gas vehicles worldwide, led by Iran (3.5 million), China (3.3 million), Pakistan (2.8 million), Argentina (2.5 million), India (1.8 million), and Brazil (1.8 million). The energy efficiency is generally equal to that of gasoline engines, but lower compared with modern diesel engines. Gasoline/petrol vehicles converted to run on natural gas suffer because of the low compression ratio of their engines, resulting in a cropping of delivered power while running on natural gas (10–15%). CNG-specific engines, however, use a higher compression ratio due to this fuel's higher octane number of 120–130.

Besides use in road vehicles, CNG can also be used in aircraft. Compressed natural gas has been used in some aircraft like the Aviat Aircraft Husky 200 CNG and the Chromarat VX-1 KittyHawk

LNG is also being used in aircraft. Russian aircraft manufacturer Tupolev for instance is running a development program to produce LNG- and hydrogen-powered aircraft. The program has been running since the mid-1970s, and seeks to develop LNG and hydrogen variants of the Tu-204 and Tu-334 passenger aircraft, and also the Tu-330 cargo aircraft. Depending on the current market price for jet fuel and LNG, fuel for an LNG-powered aircraft could cost 5,000 rubles (US$100) less per tonne, roughly 60%, with considerable reductions to carbon monoxide, hydrocarbon and nitrogen oxide emissions.

The advantages of liquid methane as a jet engine fuel are that it has more specific energy than the standard kerosene mixes do and that its low temperature can help cool the air which the engine compresses for greater volumetric efficiency, in effect replacing an intercooler. Alternatively, it can be used to lower the temperature of the exhaust.

Fertilizers

Natural gas is a major feedstock for the production of ammonia, via the Haber process, for use in fertilizer production. The development of synthetic nitrogen fertilizer has significantly supported global population growth — it has been estimated that almost half the people on the Earth are currently fed as a result of synthetic nitrogen fertilizer use.

Hydrogen

Natural gas can be used to produce hydrogen, with one common method being the hydrogen reformer. Hydrogen has many applications: it is a primary feedstock for the chemical industry, a hydrogenating agent, an important commodity for oil refineries, and the fuel source in hydrogen vehicles.

Animal and fish feed
Protein rich animal and fish feed is produced by feeding natural gas to Methylococcus capsulatus bacteria on commercial scale.

Other
Natural gas is also used in the manufacture of fabrics, glass, steel, plastics, paint, synthetic oil, and other products. The oxidative dehydrogenation of ethane leads to ethylene, which can be converted forther to ethylene epoxide, ethylene glycol, acetaldehyde or other olefins. Propane can be converted to propylene or can be oxidized to acrylic acid and acrylonitrile.

Environmental effects

Greenhouse effect and natural gas release

Human activity is responsible for about 60% of all methane emissions and for most of the resulting increase in atmospheric methane. Natural gas is intentionally released or is otherwise known to leak during the extraction, storage, transportation, and distribution of fossil fuels.  Globally, methane accounts for an estimated 33% of anthropogenic greenhouse gas warming. The decomposition of municipal solid waste (a source of landfill gas) and wastewater account for an additional 18% of such emissions.   These estimates include substantial uncertainties which should be reduced in the near future with improved satellite measurements, such as those planned for MethaneSAT.

After release to the atmosphere, methane is removed by gradual oxidation to carbon dioxide and water by hydroxyl radicals formed in the troposphere or stratosphere, giving the overall chemical reaction  + 2 →  + 2. While the lifetime of atmospheric methane is relatively short when compared to carbon dioxide, with a half-life of about 7 years, it is more efficient at trapping heat in the atmosphere, so that a given quantity of methane has 84 times the global-warming potential of carbon dioxide over a 20-year period and 28 times over a 100-year period. Natural gas is thus a potent greenhouse gas due to the strong radiative forcing of methane in the short term, and the continuing effects of carbon dioxide in the longer term.

Targeted efforts to reduce warming quickly by reducing anthropogenic methane emissions is a climate change mitigation strategy supported by the Global Methane Initiative.

Greenhouse gas emissions
When refined and burned, natural gas can produce 25–30% less carbon dioxide per joule delivered than oil, and 40–45% less than coal. It can also produce potentially fewer toxic pollutants than other hydrocarbon fuels. However, compared to other major fossil fuels, natural gas causes more emissions in relative terms during the production and transportation of the fuel, meaning that the life cycle greenhouse gas emissions are about 50% higher than the direct emissions from the site of consumption.

In terms of the warming effect over 100 years, natural gas production and use comprises about one fifth of human greenhouse gas emissions, and this contribution is growing rapidly. The IEA estimates the energy sector (oil, natural gas, coal and bioenergy) to be responsible for about 40% of human methane emissions. According to the IPCC Sixth Assessment Report, natural gas consumption grew by 15% between 2015 and 2019, compared to a 5% increase in oil and oil product consumption.

The continued financing and construction of new gas pipelines indicates that huge emissions of fossil greenhouse gases could be locked-in for 40 to 50 years into the future. In the U.S. state of Texas alone, five new long-distance gas pipelines have been under construction, with the first entering service in 2019, and the others scheduled to come online during 2020–2022.

To reduce its greenhouse emissions, the Netherlands is subsidizing a transition away from natural gas for all homes in the country by 2050. In Amsterdam, no new residential gas accounts have been allowed since 2018, and all homes in the city are expected to be converted by 2040 to use the excess heat from adjacent industrial buildings and operations.
Some cities in the United States have started prohibiting gas hookups for new houses, with state laws passed and under consideration to either require electrification or prohibit local requirements. The UK government is also experimenting with alternative home heating technologies to meet its climate goals. To preserve their businesses, natural gas utilities in the United States have been lobbying for laws preventing local electrification ordinances, and are promoting renewable natural gas and hydrogen fuel.

Other pollutants
Although natural gas produces far lower amounts of sulfur dioxide and nitrogen oxides (NOx) than other fossil fuels, NOx from burning natural gas in homes can be a health hazard.

Radionuclides
Natural gas extraction also produces radioactive isotopes of polonium (Po-210), lead (Pb-210) and radon (Rn-220). Radon is a gas with initial activity from 5 to 200,000 becquerels per cubic meter of gas. It decays rapidly to Pb-210 which can build up as a thin film in gas extraction equipment.

Safety concerns
The natural gas extraction workforce face unique health and safety challenges.

Production
Some gas fields yield sour gas containing hydrogen sulfide, a toxic compound when inhaled. Amine gas treating, an industrial scale process which removes acidic gaseous components, is often used to remove hydrogen sulfide from natural gas.

Extraction of natural gas (or oil) leads to decrease in pressure in the reservoir. Such decrease in pressure in turn may result in subsidence, sinking of the ground above. Subsidence may affect ecosystems, waterways, sewer and water supply systems, foundations, and so on.

Fracking

Releasing natural gas from subsurface porous rock formations may be accomplished by a process called hydraulic fracturing or "fracking". Since the first commercial hydraulic fracturing operation in 1949, approximately one million wells have been hydraulically fractured in the United States. The production of natural gas from hydraulically fractured wells has used the technological developments of directional and horizontal drilling, which improved access to natural gas in tight rock formations. Strong growth in the production of unconventional gas from hydraulically fractured wells occurred between 2000 and 2012.

In hydraulic fracturing, well operators force water mixed with a variety of chemicals through the wellbore casing into the rock. The high pressure water breaks up or "fracks" the rock, which releases gas from the rock formation. Sand and other particles are added to the water as a proppant to keep the fractures in the rock open, thus enabling the gas to flow into the casing and then to the surface. Chemicals are added to the fluid to perform such functions as reducing friction and inhibiting corrosion. After the "frack", oil or gas is extracted and 30–70% of the frack fluid, i.e. the mixture of water, chemicals, sand, etc., flows back to the surface. Many gas-bearing formations also contain water, which will flow up the wellbore to the surface along with the gas, in both hydraulically fractured and non-hydraulically fractured wells. This produced water often has a high content of salt and other dissolved minerals that occur in the formation.

The volume of water used to hydraulically fracture wells varies according to the hydraulic fracturing technique.  In the United States, the average volume of water used per hydraulic fracture has been reported as nearly 7,375 gallons for vertical oil and gas wells prior to 1953, nearly 197,000 gallons for vertical oil and gas wells between 2000 and 2010, and nearly 3 million gallons for horizontal gas wells between 2000 and 2010.

Determining which fracking technique is appropriate for well productivity depends largely on the properties of the reservoir rock from which to extract oil or gas.  If the rock is characterized by low-permeability – which refers to its ability to let substances, i.e. gas, pass through it, then the rock may be considered a source of tight gas. Fracking for shale gas, which is currently also known as a source of unconventional gas, involves drilling a borehole vertically until it reaches a lateral shale rock formation, at which point the drill turns to follow the rock for hundreds or thousands of feet horizontally. In contrast, conventional oil and gas sources are characterized by higher rock permeability, which naturally enables the flow of oil or gas into the wellbore with less intensive hydraulic fracturing techniques than the production of tight gas has required. The decades in development of drilling technology for conventional and unconventional oil and gas production have not only improved access to natural gas in low-permeability reservoir rocks, but also posed significant adverse impacts on environmental and public health.

The US EPA has acknowledged that toxic, carcinogenic chemicals, i.e. benzene and ethylbenzene, have been used as gelling agents in water and chemical mixtures for high volume horizontal fracturing (HVHF). Following the hydraulic fracture in HVHF, the water, chemicals, and frack fluid that return to the well's surface, called flowback or produced water, may contain radioactive materials, heavy metals, natural salts, and hydrocarbons which exist naturally in shale rock formations. Fracking chemicals, radioactive materials, heavy metals, and salts that are removed from the HVHF well by well operators are so difficult to remove from the water they are mixed with, and would so heavily pollute the water cycle, that most of the flowback is either recycled into other fracking operations or injected into deep underground wells, eliminating the water that HVHF required from the hydrologic cycle.

Historically low gas prices have delayed the nuclear renaissance, as well as the development of solar thermal energy.

Added odor
Natural gas in its native state is colorless and almost odorless.  In order to assist consumers in detecting leaks, an odorizer with a scent similar to rotten eggs, tert-Butylthiol (t-butyl mercaptan), is added. Sometimes a related compound, thiophane, may be used in the mixture. Situations in which an odorant that is added to natural gas can be detected by analytical instrumentation, but cannot be properly detected by an observer with a normal sense of smell, have occurred in the natural gas industry.  This is caused by odor masking, when one odorant overpowers the sensation of another. As of 2011, the industry is conducting research on the causes of odor masking.

Risk of explosion

Explosions caused by natural gas leaks occur a few times each year. Individual homes, small businesses and other structures are most frequently affected when an internal leak builds up gas inside the structure. Leaks often result from excavation work, such as when contractors dig and strike pipelines, sometimes without knowing any damage resulted. Frequently, the blast is powerful enough to significantly damage a building but leave it standing. In these cases, the people inside tend to have minor to moderate injuries. Occasionally, the gas can collect in high enough quantities to cause a deadly explosion, destroying one or more buildings in the process. Many building codes now forbid the installation of gas pipes inside cavity walls or below floor boards to mitigate against this risk. Gas usually dissipates readily outdoors, but can sometimes collect in dangerous quantities if flow rates are high enough. However, considering the tens of millions of structures that use the fuel, the individual risk of using natural gas is low.

Risk of carbon monoxide inhalation
Natural gas heating systems may cause carbon monoxide poisoning if unvented or poorly vented. Improvements in natural gas furnace designs have greatly reduced CO poisoning concerns. Detectors are also available that warn of carbon monoxide or explosive gases such as methane and propane.

Energy content, statistics, and pricing

Quantities of natural gas are measured in standard cubic meters (cubic meter of gas at temperature  and pressure ) or standard cubic feet (cubic foot of gas at temperature 60.0 °F and pressure ), 1 standard cubic meter = 35.301 standard cubic feet. This is about 50 to 54 MJ/kg depending on the density. For comparison, the heat of combustion of pure methane is 37.7 MJ per standard cubic metre, or 55.5 MJ/kg.

Except in the European Union, the U.S., and Canada, natural gas is sold in gigajoule retail units. LNG (liquefied natural gas) and LPG (liquefied petroleum gas) are traded in metric tonnes (1,000 kg) or million BTU as spot deliveries. Long term natural gas distribution contracts are signed in cubic meters, and LNG contracts are in metric tonnes. The LNG and LPG is transported by specialized transport ships, as the gas is liquified at cryogenic temperatures. The specification of each LNG/LPG cargo will usually contain the energy content, but this information is in general not available to the public. The European Union aims to cut its gas dependency on Russia by two-thirds in 2022.

In August 2015, possibly the largest natural gas discovery in history was made and notified by an Italian gas company ENI. This was named the Zohr gas field and could hold a potential  of natural gas. The Zohr field was found in the deep waters off the northern coast of Egypt and ENI claims that it will be the largest ever in the Mediterranean and even the world.

European Union
Gas prices for end users vary greatly across the EU. A single European energy market, one of the key objectives of the EU, should level the prices of gas in all EU member states. Moreover, it would help to resolve supply and global warming issues, as well as strengthen relations with other Mediterranean countries and foster investments in the region. Qatar has been asked by the US to supply emergency gas to the EU in case of supply disruptions in the Russo-Ukrainian crisis.

United States

The actual heating value when the water formed does not condense is the net heat of combustion and can be as much as 10% less.

In the United States, retail sales are often in units of therms (th); 1 therm = 100,000 BTU. Gas sales to domestic consumers are often in units of 100 standard cubic feet (scf). Gas meters measure the volume of gas used, and this is converted to therms by multiplying the volume by the energy content of the gas used during that period, which varies slightly over time. The typical annual consumption of a single family residence is 1,000 therms or one Residential Customer Equivalent (RCE). Wholesale transactions are generally done in decatherms (Dth), thousand decatherms (MDth), or million decatherms (MMDth). A million decatherms is a trillion BTU, roughly a billion cubic feet of natural gas.

The price of natural gas varies greatly depending on location and type of consumer. The typical caloric value of natural gas is roughly 1,000 BTU per cubic foot, depending on gas composition. Natural gas in the United States is traded as a futures contract on the New York Mercantile Exchange. Thus, if the price of gas is $10/million BTU on the NYMEX, the contract is worth $100,000.

Canada

Canada uses metric measure for internal trade of petrochemical products. Consequently, natural gas is sold by the gigajoule (GJ), cubic meter (m3) or thousand cubic meters (E3m3). Distribution infrastructure and meters almost always meter volume (cubic foot or cubic meter). Some jurisdictions, such as Saskatchewan, sell gas by volume only. Other jurisdictions, such as Alberta, gas is sold by the energy content (GJ). In these areas, almost all meters for residential and small commercial customers measure volume (m3 or ft3), and billing statements include a multiplier to convert the volume to energy content of the local gas supply.

The energy content of gas supply in Canada can vary from  depending on gas supply and processing between the wellhead and the customer.

Adsorbed natural gas (ANG)
Natural gas may be stored by adsorbing it to the porous solids called sorbents. The optimal condition for methane storage is at room temperature and atmospheric pressure. Pressures up to 4 MPa (about 40 times atmospheric pressure) will yield greater storage capacity. The most common sorbent used for ANG is activated carbon (AC), primarily in three forms: Activated Carbon Fiber (ACF), Powdered Activated Carbon (PAC), and activated carbon monolith.

See also

 Associated petroleum gas
 Energy transition
 Gas/oil ratio
 Natural gas by country
 Peak gas
 Power-to-gas
 Renewable natural gas
 World energy supply and consumption

References

Further reading
 Blanchard, Charles (2020). The Extraction State: A History of Natural Gas in America. U of Pittsburgh Press. online review.

External links
 Global Fossil Infrastructure Tracker
 Carbon Mapper Data Portal featuring methane point source data

 
Chinese inventions
Fuel gas
Fossil fuels